The Miracle is the thirteenth studio album by the British rock band Queen, released on 22 May 1989 by Parlophone Records and Capitol Records in both the United Kingdom and the US, respectively, where it was the band's first and final studio album to be released on those respective labels. The album was recorded as the band recovered from Brian May's marital problems and Freddie Mercury's HIV diagnosis in 1987 (which was known to the band, though not publicised at the time). Recording started in January 1988 and lasted for an entire year. The album was originally going to be called The Invisible Men, but three weeks before the release, according to Roger Taylor, they changed the name to The Miracle. It was also the last Queen album with a photo of the band on the front cover.

The album reached number one in the UK, Austria, Germany, the Netherlands, and Switzerland, and number 24 on the US Billboard Top Pop Albums chart. AllMusic would name The Miracle as Queen's best album of the 1980s, along with The Game. It would prove to be the band's penultimate album to be recorded with Freddie Mercury, as he died on 24 November 1991, nine months after their next album, Innuendo, was released.

Songs

Side one

"Party"
"Party" began as a jam session between Freddie Mercury, Brian May and John Deacon. Mercury was at the piano and he started off the "we had a good night" section. From then on the three of them worked together and completed it. May sings lead on a small portion of the song near the beginning.

"Khashoggi's Ship"
"Khashoggi's Ship" was started by Mercury with all four band members contributing to the lyrics and music. The song is about famous billionaire Adnan Khashoggi and a ship (the Nabila, now Kingdom 5KR) that he owned at the time and was one of the largest private yachts in the world. On the album, this track segues from "Party", to which it has a very similar lyrical theme. The song served as the reference to the name of the Khashoggi character in the We Will Rock You musical.

"The Miracle"

"The Miracle" is one of the most complex songs from the band's latter years. Mercury and Deacon co-wrote the chords together. It is one of May's favourite songs. The entire band contributed lyrical and some musical ideas, and Mercury played piano as well as many synth tracks, using a Korg M1 and a Roland D-50.

"I Want It All"

"I Want It All" was composed by May in 1987. On the "Greatest Video Hits II" DVD, May commented that the song was inspired by his second wife, Anita Dobson's, favourite motto, "I want it all, and I want it now!" The idea of having intro, verses, choruses and solos over the same chord progression was reused on their next album with another May song, "The Show Must Go On", from 1991. Mercury sang lead vocals for most of the song, but Mercury and May share lead vocals during the bridge. Mercury played keyboards, May played acoustic and electric guitars while Taylor used double-kick bass drums for the first (and only) time.

"The Invisible Man"

"The Invisible Man" is Taylor's first song on the album. The lyrical idea came from a book he was reading. May and Taylor commented (Queen for an Hour interview, 1989) that Taylor wrote part of the song in the bath (similarly to what happened with Mercury and "Crazy Little Thing Called Love" ten years before). Each of the four band members are name-checked in the vocals by Freddie throughout the course of the song: "Freddie Mercury" right before the first verse begins (done by Roger Taylor), "John Deacon" after the first verse, "Brian May" (said twice) before his guitar solo, and "Roger Taylor" (with the initial "r" rolled by Mercury to sound like a drum roll) after the final chorus; Taylor "answers" with a drum fill. The demo version contains a completely different middle-eight with Mercury singing alternate lyrics in the style of Elvis Presley. The whispered parts of the chorus are sung by Taylor.

Side two

"Breakthru"

"Breakthru" is a combination of two songs: "When Love Breaks Up", by Mercury, and "Breakthru", written by Taylor with input by the others in the key change. Taylor's mid-1980s songs tended to be in flat keys, when he started writing at the piano instead of on a guitar. This song was released as a single and made the top ten in the UK over the summer of 1989.

"Rain Must Fall"
"Rain Must Fall" is a collaboration between Deacon (music) and Mercury (lyrics). Taylor recorded a lot of Latin percussion but most of that was edited out in order to have more space for vocal harmonies, guitars and keyboards, the latter shared between Mercury and Deacon in this piece.

"Scandal"

"Scandal" was written by May about the British press, in the wake of media-fuelled controversy about his recent divorce, his relationship with Anita Dobson, and Mercury's rare public appearances due to his battle with AIDS. May played keyboards and did the guitar solo as a first take. Mercury's lead vocals were also a first take. Synth-bass is played by David Richards. May has since commented that the song is very close to his heart.

"My Baby Does Me"
"My Baby Does Me" is another collaboration of Mercury and Deacon. Both of them had the idea of a simpler track in order to ease off the album. In a Radio 1 interview in 1989, each of them claimed the other had constructed the bassline. The song was originally demoed as "My Baby Loves Me", but was rewritten to replace the word "loves" with "does" throughout. The drum pattern in this song is the same as that featured in the demo of "I Guess We're Falling Out".

"Was It All Worth It"
"Was It All Worth It" was composed by Mercury. The song harks back to the band's intricately produced sound in the 1970s. Though the bulk of the song was masterminded by Mercury, all members contributed ideas and lyrics (for example, Taylor contributed the line "we love you madly!"). Deacon later cited the song as his favourite on the album. Taylor uses a gong and timpani. Despite it not being released as a single, it remains hugely popular among the Queen fanbase.

Non-album tracks

"Hang on in There"
This song was initiated by Mercury, with lyrics that relate to his illness. The song's working title was "A Fiddly Jam". May plays both acoustic and electric guitars, as well as keyboards, a job he shared with Mercury, who also plays piano. The song originally appeared as the B-side to the "I Want It All" single. In the song, Mercury hits an E5 twice. The first time is after "Your life is incomplete, Hang on in there" the next line is sung "Ha-ing there", the E5 is on the "Ha". The second time is after "Pray for that magical moment and it will appear", the next line is "Wait for that moment", this E5 is on the "Wait".

"Chinese Torture"
The only CD track that did not appear on a single release. For the first time this track emerged during the last concerts of Queen's 1986 Magic Tour as part of May's guitar solo. He also included it in his solos when he was back on tour with Queen + Paul Rodgers in 2005 and 2006.

"Stealin
Principally composed by Mercury (though, as all other songs from these sessions, credited to the band as a whole), this song is a tongue-in-cheek representation of a man who spends his life committing robbery. The song is performed mainly through spoken words, but occasionally has lines sung. This song appeared as the B-side to the "Breakthru" single.

"Hijack My Heart"
The song, credited to the band as an entity rather than one composer, was actually written by Taylor, who also provides lead vocals. It tells the story of a man who falls in love with a woman he meets, despite his original annoyance at her rudeness and mannerisms. It was the B-side to "The Invisible Man".

"My Life Has Been Saved"
Written by Deacon (originally as an acoustic track) about the state the world is in, this song was the B-side to "Scandal". A reworked version was later released on the 1995 Made in Heaven album.

"Dog with a Bone"
This song was recorded in 1988 during the studio sessions of The Miracle album, but did not make the final album sequence. It was included in the 2022 box set The Miracle Collector's Edition in November 2022.

"Face It Alone"
"Face It Alone" was recorded during The Miracle sessions in 1988. The song was eventually released as a single on 13 October 2022. "Face It Alone" was written by all four members of Queen and was produced by David Richards, Kris Fredriksson and Justin Shirley-Smith. The song peaked at number 90 in the UK. An accompanying music video was released on October 21, 2022. The track was included on The Miracle Collector's Edition.

Artwork
The cover art was created by designer Richard Gray, utilising a chroma key and the Quantel Paintbox workstation, then state of the art image-manipulation technology, to combine photographs of the familiar faces of the four band members into one morphed gestalt image. This visual is in line with their decision to dispense with individual credits and simply present their music as the product of Queen; the back cover went a step further with a seamless regiment of the band's eyes.

Singles
Five singles were released from the album, all in 1989:

"I Want It All" was the lead single from the album, released in the UK on 2 May; it hit number three in the British charts but made it to number one in numerous other European countries. The song became an anti-apartheid anthem among youth in South Africa and also has been used to protest other causes. This well-known anthem has been heard as a rallying song for African youth. The song became Queen's first American rock radio hit since "Under Pressure" by peaking at number three on Billboards Mainstream Rock Singles chart, but only reached number 50 on the Billboard Hot 100 Chart.
"Breakthru" was the second single from the album released in the UK on 19 June; its video was filmed on a private steam train known as The Miracle Express. The song peaked at number seven in the UK. The song was also released as a single in the US. Also appearing in the video was Debbie Leng, who was at the time Roger Taylor's girlfriend.
"The Invisible Man", released in the UK on 7 August, hit number 12 in the UK and was a hit throughout Europe; the video showed scores of computer-duplicated band members moving in unison. This song was later covered by Scatman John.
"Scandal" was the album's fourth single, and peaked at number 25 in the UK. It is a protest song about the way the tabloids dealt with May's relationship with Anita Dobson.
"The Miracle" was the fifth and final single from the album, released on 27 November in the UK, reaching number 21 on the British charts. Its video involved young Queen lookalikes (including a then-unknown Ross McCall) who performed a Queen-style stage show. The real band appeared only at the end jamming with their younger counterparts.

Critical reception

The Sun-Sentinel wrote "With Freddie Mercury in vintage light-operatic form, here's an album (like so many of Queen's others) that should be used as a pop music how-to for aspirants. Combining the forces of rock, pop, metal, clever melodies and cunning stylisations, The Miracle never lets down. From one track to the next there is, as usual, no telling which way this band will go, affording even the most jaded ear a challenge."

Newsday (Melville, NY) wrote "On The Miracle, Mercury's voice is steady and solid, May's runs are as flashy and supple as ever. Most of the 10 songs, written collaboratively by the four members, stick pretty much to the band's formula of mini-suites: edgy pop with tempos that change half-way into the number and some delicious hooks."

Rolling Stone stated "The Miracle is a showcase for Freddie Mercury and his love of sweeping, quasi-operatic vocals. And indeed, Mercury – especially on the title track – has never sounded better... Only on a few tracks ("Khashoggi's Ship" and "Was It All Worth It") does May really let it rip, and when he does, it's like the old Queen peeping out for just a moment and then turning tail... At least The Miracle offers little snippets of Queen's former majesty."

AllMusic stated "The Miracle packs quite a sonic punch, recalling the rich sounds of their past classics (1976's A Day at the Races, etc.). Split 50/50 between pop and heavy rock, the album was another global smash. Along with The Game, The Miracle is Queen's strongest album of the '80s."

Track listing
All tracks credited to Queen. All lead vocals by Freddie Mercury unless noted.

 Sides one and two were combined as tracks 1–10 on the CD release.

Personnel
Track numbering refers to CD and digital releases of the album.QueenFreddie Mercury – lead vocals , backing vocals , keyboards , drum machine 
Brian May – electric guitar , backing vocals , keyboards , acoustic guitar , co-lead vocals 
Roger Taylor – drums , backing vocals , percussion , drum machine , keyboards , electric guitar , lead vocals 
John Deacon – bass guitar , electric guitar , keyboards Additional personnel'
David Richards – keyboards , sampler , engineering
Assistant engineers – Andrew Bradfield, John Brough, Angelique Cooper, Claude Frider, Andy Mason, Justin Shirley-Smith
Mastered by Kevin Metcalf and Gordon Vickary
Computer programming by Brian Zellis
Album sleeve design by Richard Gray
Original photography by Simon Fowler

2022 box set reissue  
In October 2022, Queen announced plans for a November 18 reissue of the album, featuring six unreleased tracks, four featuring Mercury as the lead vocalist. Queen said that the eight-disc collection contains alternate takes, demos, and radio interviews.

As part of the announcement, Queen released the previous unheard song "Face It Alone." "We did find a little gem from Freddie, that we'd kind of forgotten about," Taylor said of the track. "It's wonderful, a real discovery. It's a very passionate piece."

Of the song, May said:
"It was kind of hiding in plain sight. We looked at it many times and thought, oh no, we can't really rescue that. But in fact, we went in there again and our wonderful engineering team went, 'OK, we can do this and this.' It's like kind of stitching bits together... but it's beautiful, it's touching."

The other unreleased tracks are "When Love Breaks Up" (Mercury), "You Know You Belong to Me" (May), "Dog with a Bone" (Taylor), "Water" (May) and "I Guess We're Falling Out" (Deacon).

Charts

Weekly charts

Year-end charts

Certifications and sales

References

1989 albums
Albums produced by David Richards (record producer)
Hollywood Records albums
Parlophone albums
Queen (band) albums
Albums recorded at Olympic Sound Studios